Kalachpa (also Romanized as Kalāchpā; also known as Kalāj Pā) is a village in Baladeh Rural District, Khorramabad District, Tonekabon County, Mazandaran Province, Iran. At the 2006 census, its population was 60, in 16 families.

References 

Populated places in Tonekabon County